Pusher may refer to:

Film and television
 Pusher (film series), a trilogy by the Danish director Nicolas Winding Refn
 Pusher (1996 film), the first film in the series
 Pusher II (2004), the second film in the series
 Pusher 3 (2005), the third film in the series
 Pusher (2012 film), a British remake of the 1996 film, directed by Luis Prieto
 The Pusher (film), a 1960 American film directed by Gene Milford, based on an Ed McBain novel
 "Pusher" (The X-Files), a television episode
 Pusher, a fictional type of telepathic character in the 2009 film Push

Music
 Pusher (musician), Canadian musician
 "The Pusher", a 1968 song by Steppenwolf, written by Hoyt Axton
 "Pusher", a song by Nickelback from the album Curb, 1996
 The Pusher (band), a Swedish pop group
 Pusher, a 2018 album by Dani M

Sports and games
 Pusher (tennis), a type of defensive tennis player
 Pusher game, a type of medal game
 Pusher, a stick used to play underwater hockey
 Pusher, a game manufactured by Peri Spiele

Transport
 Pusher (boat),  a vessel designed for pushing barges or car floats
 Pusher configuration, an aircraft configuration
 Pusher engine, or bank engine, a type of railway locomotive
 Pusher trailer, a power-assistive device attached to the rear of a vehicle or bike
 Passenger pusher, a worker who helps people board mass transit vehicles at crowded stops

Other uses
 Pusher centrifuge, a filtration technique
 Tool pusher, or just pusher, the manager of an oil rig
 Pusher, a dealer in the illegal drug trade
 Pusher, a layer in nuclear weapon design